All Hallows School may refer to:

 All Hallows Catholic School, Weybourne, Surrey, England
 All Hallows Catholic High School, Penwortham, Lancashire, England
 All Hallows High School,  South Bronx, New York, United States
 All Hallows Roman Catholic High School, Salford, Greater Manchester, England
 All Hallows' School, Brisbane, Australia
 All Hallows' School Buildings, the heritage-listed buildings at All Hallows' School, Brisbane
 All Hallows Preparatory School, East Cranmore, Shepton Mallet, Somerset, England

See also
 All Hallows College, a college of higher education in Dublin
 All Hallows Catholic College, Macclesfield
 All Hallows (disambiguation)